Margareta Pålsson (born 18 August 1949) was the Governor of Skåne, in office from 2012 to 2016. A politician of the Moderate Party, Pålsson was a member of the Riksdag, the Parliament of Sweden, from 2002 to 2012.

References

External links
Margareta Pålsson at the Riksdag website

Living people
1949 births
Governors of Skåne County
Members of the Riksdag from the Moderate Party
Women members of the Riksdag
Members of the Riksdag 2002–2006
21st-century Swedish women politicians
Women county governors of Sweden